Boar's Head may refer to:
 Boar's head
 Boar's head, see Boars in heraldry
 Boar's Head Feast, a festival of the Christmas season
 Boar's Head Inn, any of several current and former taverns in London and elsewhere
 Boar's Head Inn, Eastcheap
 Boar's Head Inn, Southwark
 Boar's Head Inn, Bishop's Stortford, Hertfordshire
 Boar's Head Theatre, Whitechapel
 Boar's Head Provision Company, a delicatessen food supplier
 Boar's Head railway station, formerly in Standish, Greater Manchester
 Boar's Head Resort, a hotel and resort in Charlottesville, Virginia
 Boar's Head Society, a former student society at Columbia University
 Battle of the Boar's Head, France, 1916

See also
 At the Boar's Head
 "Boar's Head Carol"
 Boar's Head Resort Women's Open
 Horncastle boar's head
 Little Boar's Head Historic District, North Hampton, New Hampshire